"Ayo Technology" is the fourth single from 50 Cent's third album, Curtis. It was released on July 24, 2007. The song, featuring Justin Timberlake and vocals from Timbaland, who also produced the song along with Danja, has peaked at number five on the Billboard Hot 100. Internationally, the song peaked within the top ten of the charts in many countries, including Australia, Denmark and the United Kingdom. The song has since been covered by Milow, a Belgian singer-songwriter whose version was successful in a number of countries, including Belgium, Spain, Germany, Italy, and the Netherlands. The song was also covered by Katerine Avgoustakis, another Belgian singer, whose version was very successful in various Central and Eastern European countries, particularly in Poland.

Background
HipHopDX reported that the song was renamed three times. It was first titled "Ayo Pornography" when it first leaked in May 2007, then "Ayo Technology" in June, and then "She Wants It" by July. Finally, the song title was reverted to "Ayo Technology." The song features Justin Timberlake and Timbaland. In 2008, it was nominated for a Grammy for Best Rap Song. As revealed within its lyrics, "Ayo Technology" puts a strong emphasis on hot-blooded sexual fantasies, explicit body movements, and wild festivities at nightclubs.

Critical response
Rob Sheffield from Rolling Stone gave the song a mixed review: "The I-need-love pop tunes are not getting any better, even with Timbaland and Justin Timberlake in the stripper ditty 'Ayo Technology.'" Pitchfork also gave a mixed review: "The album's only concession to modern pop trends— the Timbaland-produced, Timberlake-hooked "Ayo Technology"—flies off the rails as 50, ripped from his comfort zone, falls behind the gurgling, video-game-blipping beat. Though he tries to force the track into more familiar territory with a cyborg-stripper theme, Justin nabs the spotlight without even trying." David Jeffries from AllMusic highlighted and wrote: "At ease is the Timbaland production "Ayo Technology" featuring Justin Timberlake, an obvious single that's "been there, done that" for all parties involved. This doesn't mean it's bland, just safe." The A.V. Club was also positive: "Ayo Technology" follows the sexed-up template of "Candy Shop" and "Just A Lil Bit" in providing strip clubs with the most perfunctory soundtrack possible."

Remixes and covers
The official remix features hip hop and R&B artist Casely. Rapper Krayzie Bone did a remix called "Perfect Execution" off his 2008 mixtape The Fixtape: Smoke on This. An acoustic cover of "Ayo Technology" performed by Belgian singer Milow was released in a number of European countries, topping the charts in the Netherlands, Belgium, Spain, Sweden and Switzerland, and also charting well in countries such as Germany, where the song was certified Platinum for shipping 300,000 copies, as well as in Romania. In September 2009, British singer Skyla released a cover version of the song. Earlier in 2009, Katerine Avgoustakis also made a cover of the song which became her first international single and underwent great success. It was number one for one week in Poland on the country's Official Airplay Chart, ranked by Nielsen SoundScan. Rockabilly band The Baseballs include "Ayo Technology" as part of a medley including covers of "Poker Face" and "Jungle Drum" whilst on tour. British duo Jaqobi also recorded their own version of the song for their 2010 EP Two Brothers, A Guitar & A Bar. British recording artist Craig David also used the song to remix his own song "Hot Stuff (Let's Dance)".

American rapper Flo Rida released his own remix, called the POE Boy remix.

Music video
The music video was premiered by BET on August 2, 2007, and was filmed in North London. 50 Cent described the music video to MTV. He said:  Timbaland's appearance in the music video uses features from the movie Minority Report such as moving computer interfaces with hands. Justin Timberlake's appearance is similar to that of his role in his music video "SexyBack".

Chart performance
In the United States, "Ayo Technology" became 50 Cent's second highest debut on the Billboard Hot 100, entering at #22. The following week, it rose to #18, before falling to #21. One week after, "Ayo Technology" rose to #19. One week later, during the release of 50 Cent's Curtis and Kanye West's Graduation, the song skyrocketed to a peak of #5, becoming 50 Cent's eighth top-ten single as a lead artist, and eleventh overall. In the United Kingdom, the song debuted at #10 on the UK Singles Chart on downloads alone, becoming his eighth top ten single on the chart. It peaked at number two, becoming 50 Cent's highest-charting single in Britain, beating out "In Da Club", which peaked at number three in March 2003. In New Zealand, the song debuted at number eight on the New Zealand Singles Chart, jumping to number one the following week where it stayed for three consecutive weeks. It stayed on the chart for 22 weeks and was certified Gold, selling over 7,500 copies.

Track listing
 2-Track
 "Ayo Technology" – 4:07
 "I Get Money [Straight to the Bank Pt. 2]" – 4:00

 Maxi CD
 "Ayo Technology" – 4:07
 "I Get Money [Straight to the Bank Pt. 2]" – 4:00
 "Ayo Technology" (instrumental) – 4:07
 "Ayo Technology" (CD-rom video) – 4:07

Charts

50 Cent version

Year-end charts

Milow version

Year-end charts

Decade-end charts

Katerine Avgoustakis version

Certifications

50 Cent version

Milow version

Release history

See also
 List of number-one singles from the 2000s (decade) (New Zealand)
 Ultratop 50 number-one hits of 2008
 List of number-one hits in Denmark
 List of Dutch Top 40 number-one singles of 2009
 List of Swedish number-one hits
 List of number-one hits of 2009 (Switzerland)

References

2007 singles
2007 songs
50 Cent songs
Aftermath Entertainment singles
European Hot 100 Singles number-one singles
Interscope Records singles
Justin Timberlake songs
Music videos directed by Joseph Kahn
Number-one singles in Denmark
Number-one singles in New Zealand
Number-one singles in Sweden
Shady Records singles
Song recordings produced by Danja (record producer)
Song recordings produced by Timbaland
Songs written by 50 Cent
Songs written by Danja (record producer)
Songs written by Justin Timberlake
Songs written by Timbaland
Timbaland songs
Universal Music Group singles
Dirty rap songs
Pop-rap songs